is a 1961 Japanese film directed by Yasuzo Masumura. It is a courtroom drama about a young wife on trial for murdering her older husband after cutting his rope whilst mountaineering.

Cast
 Hideo Takamatsu as Kasai

References

External links

1961 films
1961 drama films
1960s legal films
Japanese drama films
Films directed by Yasuzo Masumura
1960s Japanese films